São Sebastião do Alto is a municipality located in the Brazilian state of Rio de Janeiro. Its population was 9,387 (2020) and its area is 397 km².

References

Municipalities in Rio de Janeiro (state)